Pohoří is a municipality and village in Prague-West District in the Central Bohemian Region of the Czech Republic. It has about 400 inhabitants.

Administrative parts
Villages of Chotouň and Skalsko are administrative parts of Pohoří.

References

Villages in Prague-West District